Yuri Chesnokov may refer to:

 Yuri Chesnokov (volleyball) (1933–2010), Russian volleyball player
 Yuri Chesnokov (footballer) (1952–1999), Soviet football player